David Duncan (1831 – 30 December 1886) was a British merchant and shipper and a Liberal Party politician who briefly represented the seat of Barrow-in-Furness.

Duncan was born  at Alyth, Perthshire, the fourth son of James Duncan, a manufacturer and merchant, and was educated at the High School of Dundee. He and his elder brother James went to South America where they became very successful traders.
In 1851 he went into partnership with Alexander Balfour and Stephen Williamson in the shipping business of Balfour Williamson. He and Williamson were based in Valparaiso while Balfour looked after the Liverpool end of the business.

After the partnership ran into personal difficulties, Duncan left Balfour Williamson in 1863, and formed his own company, Duncan Fox & Co., which became a great commercial rival of Balfour Williamson in Chile, with interests in mining as well as shipping.  He returned to England and lived at  Gayton Hall in Cheshire where he was a J. P.  and was also a director of the Royal Insurance Company.

In 1885 he was elected as a Member of Parliament for Barrow-in-Furness, but was unseated on petition. He was then elected to represent Liverpool Exchange which he held until his death later that year.

In 1856 Duncan married Catherine Williamson of Anstruther, sister of Stephen Williamson. Their eldest son James was born in Valparaiso.  James was also briefly MP for Barrow-in-Furness. His grandson by another son, Sir James Duncan, was also an MP and became a baronet.

References

External links 
 
 Clan Duncan Society - Duncans of Jordanstone

1830 births
1886 deaths
British businesspeople in shipping
People from Angus, Scotland
People educated at the High School of Dundee
Liberal Party (UK) MPs for English constituencies
UK MPs 1885–1886
UK MPs 1886–1892
19th-century British businesspeople